Johnny Cook (March 22, 1949 – May 14, 2000) was a Southern Gospel singer. He led a group, the Johnny Cook Trio, in the 1980s. Cook was a tenor and also sang with The Happy Goodmans and Statesmen. Cook may be best remembered for his years singing with The Happy Goodmans, where he and Vestal Goodman would often engage in friendly contests to see who could sing higher; Cook usually won singing the song Looking For A City.

In 1974 and 1975, Cook won the award for Favorite Tenor from the Singing News Fan Awards.

Cook released three albums in the 1970s. His first album was Voice Extraordinaire.

In the late 70's Cook also released the Johnny Cook tape club where he preaches and sings the good news to his fans.

In 1993 Cook was featured in two Gaither Homecoming videos, Old Friends and Turn Your Radio On because of his involvement with the Statesman during that time.

A collection of 169 of Cook's videos has been archived on www.youtube.com.

Death
Johnny Ray Cook died on May 14, 2000 in Huntsville, AL as a result of congestive heart failure. He was survived by three sons and his mother. He is interred at Oakwood Cemetery in Milan, Tennessee.

Albums 

The SongMasters- The Happy Sounds of The SongMasters

The Meadows Brothers-Laying Up Treasures

The Goodman-Covered In Warmth

The Goodmans-The Goodman Greats

The Goodmans-Happy Goodman Family Hour

The Goodmans-Refreshing

The Goodmans-Southern Gospel Treasury

The Goodmans DVD-Texas Live

The Goodmans-Goin Higher

Johnny Cook-Full Circle

Johnny Cook-A Johnny Cook Christmas

Johnny Cook-He's The Real Thing

Johnny Cook-Real Goodness

Johnny Cook-Spirit

Johnny Cook-The Voice

Johnny Cook-The Voice (rare)

Johnny Cook-The Voice Extraordinaire

Johnny Cook Trio-Stepping Out

Johnny Cook Trio-You Make It Happen

Johnny Cook & The Voices Triumphant-Unforgettable

The New Statesmen-Revival

The New Statesmen-Oh My Lord What A Time

The New Statesmen-Oh What A Savior

References

1949 births
2000 deaths
Southern gospel performers
20th-century American singers